Edward Francis Cavanagh Jr. (August 18, 1906 – June 17, 1986) was appointed the 18th Fire Commissioner of the City of New York by Mayor Robert F. Wagner Jr. on January 1, 1954 and served in that position until his resignation on December 31, 1961. He had previously served as the commissioner of the city Department of Marine and Aviation from 1950 to 1954. He died in 1986 at Morristown Memorial Hospital in Morristown, New Jersey.

References

Commissioners of the New York City Fire Department
1986 deaths
1906 births
People from Boca Raton, Florida